Hirajima (written: 平嶋 or 平島) is a Japanese surname. Notable people with the surname include:

, Japanese idol and actress
, Japanese footballer

Japanese-language surnames